Uchgaon is a census town in Kolhapur district in the state of Maharashtra, India. Unchgaon is a village adjacent to Kolhapur. It is covered by village Mudshingi at its east, Gandhinagar at its north east, Shiroli at north, Sarnobatwadi at its south.

Demographics
 India census, Uchgaon had a population of 22,581. Males constitute 53% of the population and females 47%. Uchgaon has an average literacy rate of 71%, higher than the national average of 59.5%: male literacy is 77%, and female literacy is 65%. In Uchgaon, 14% of the population is under 6 years of age.

References

Cities and towns in Kolhapur district